This is a list of museums in the Province of Como, Lombardy Region, Italy.

Museums and ecomuseums

References

External links 
 Cultural observatory of Lombardy Region

 
 
Province of Monza and Brianza
Monza